Machol was a private serving as an Indian Scout in the United States Army during the Indian Wars who received the Medal of Honor for bravery.

Biography
Machol was born in Arizona and after entering the army served as a scout in the Indian Wars. He received the Medal of Honor for "engagements with Apaches".

Medal of Honor citation
Rank and organization: Private, Indian Scouts. Place and date: Arizona, 1872–73. Entered service at: ------. Birth: Arizona. Date of issue: 12 April 1875

Citation:

Gallant conduct during campaigns and engagements with Apaches.

Burial
His date and place of death are unknown. A cenotaph in his honor is maintained at the Arizona Veterans Memorial Cemetery in Marana, Pima County, Arizona.

See also

List of Medal of Honor recipients for the Indian Wars

References

External links

Year of birth missing
Year of death missing
United States Army Medal of Honor recipients
United States Army soldiers
People from Arizona
United States Army Indian Scouts
American Indian Wars recipients of the Medal of Honor
19th-century Native Americans